Third-seeded team Linky Boshoff and Ilana Kloss won the title after defeating Laura duPont and Wendy Turnbull in the final.

Seeds
A champion seed is indicated in bold text while text in italics indicates the round in which that seed was eliminated.

Draw

Finals

Top half

Bottom half

References

U.S. Clay Court Championships
1976 U.S. Clay Court Championships